Isaac Morier (1750–1817) was British consul-general of the Levant Company at Constantinople.

Early life
Isaac Morier was born on 12 August 1750 in Smyrna. He was from a Huguenot family. He was educated at Harrow.

Career
In 1803, he lost his fortune in 1803 and had to work. In 1804, he was appointed the first consul-general of the Levant Company at Constantinople, and on the dissolution of the company in 1806, he became his Britannic majesty's consul. He also became an agent of the East India Company, and held both positions until his death in 1817 from the plague in Constantinople.

Personal life
Morier became a naturalised Englishman.  In 1775, he married Clara van Lennep, daughter of the Dutch consul-general and president of the Dutch Levant Company. 
They had children including:
 John Philip Morier (1776–1853), diplomat
 James Justinian Morier (1780-1849), diplomat and novelist
 David Richard Morier (1784–1877), diplomat
 William Morier (1790-1864), admiral

Death
He died in 1817.

Notes

References

1750 births
1817 deaths
People educated at Harrow School
British East India Company civil servants
Isaac